Durkin is a surname. Notable people with the surname include: 

 Barbara Durkin, English actress
 Brian F. Durkin (born 1976), American actor
 D. J. Durkin (born 1978), American football coach
 Jim Durkin (born 1961), American politician

 Junior Durkin (1915–1935), American actor
 Kathy Durkin,  Irish singer

 Paul Durkin (born 1955), English football referee
 Raymond M. Durkin (born 1936), American politician
 Shane Durkin (born 1987), Irish hurler
 Tom Durkin (sportscaster) (born 1950), American sportscaster
 Tom Durkin (artist) (1853–1902), Australian cartoonist
 Tom Durkin (soccer coach), American soccer manager
 Thomas Durkin (rugby league), rugby footballer
 Thomas Anthony Durkin, American lawyer
 Thomas M. Durkin, US District Judge for the Northern District of Illinois

See also 
 Durkin Opening
 Molly Durkin, song
 Muirsheen Durkin, song
 Dorkin, variation of the surname Durkin